Injustice  is a series of fighting video games developed by NetherRealm Studios and published by Warner Bros. Interactive Entertainment, featuring characters from the DC Comics universe. The games were directed by Mortal Kombat creator and industry veteran, Ed Boon, whose team had previously developed Mortal Kombat vs DC Universe for Midway Games, and written by Brian Chard, Dominic Cianciolo and John Vogel and Jon Greenberg. The series features the voice talents of Kevin Conroy, George Newbern, Susan Eisenberg, Phil LaMarr, Alan Tudyk, Grey Griffin, Fred Tatasciore, Tara Strong, Khary Payton and Richard Epcar, reprising their roles from various DC Comics based media. 

The series' plot and premise take place within an alternate reality to the main DC Universe continuity, where Superman becomes a tyrant and establishes a new world order after the Joker tricks him into killing Lois Lane and destroying Metropolis, causing Batman to form an insurgency in an effort to stop his regime. The first game, Injustice: Gods Among Us (2013), focuses on Batman receiving aid from an alternate universe where he summons counterparts of the Justice League's members from another universe to join his insurgency and end the regime. The second game, Injustice 2 (2017), follows the same narrative five years later after the events of the first game set in the same universe of the Regime where Batman's insurgency rebuilds society after Superman's fall while dealing with a Society of Super Villains led by Gorilla Grodd and the alien collector Brainiac, forcing Batman to consider freeing Superman to help combat the threats.

Games

Injustice: Gods Among Us

In the first game of the series, set in an alternate reality, Superman establishes a new world order after the Joker tricks him into killing Lois Lane and destroying Metropolis with a nuclear bomb. In an effort to stop this, Batman summons counterparts from another universe to end the regime.

Injustice 2

Set five years after the events of Injustice: Gods Among Us, Injustice 2 features a bigger cast of characters and set in the same universe where Batman and his Insurgency rebuilds society after Superman's fall while dealing with a Society of Super Villains led by Gorilla Grodd and a collector of worlds called Brainiac, where Batman has no choice but to consider freeing Superman to even out the odds.

Characters
List indicator(s)
 A light grey cell indicates the character was not in the video game or the animated film.

In other media

Comics

The Injustice: Gods Among Us comic book series was announced by Ed Boon on October 5, 2012, during the EB Games Expo. The series serves as a prequel detailing the events leading up to the game, as well as those that happen in the interregnum between Superman's murder of the Joker and the discovery of the primary universe. The series was first written by Tom Taylor and illustrated by a number of artists, including Jheremy Raapack, Mike S. Miller, Bruno Redondo, Tom Derenick, and others. The comic was released digitally beginning on January 15, 2013. The series was later issued in regular comic book form, and eventually a collected edition. In December 2014, Tom Taylor announced that he would be leaving the series and left after writing Injustice: Year Three #14, with Brian Buccellato replacing him by continuing the story into Year Four and Five. The final chapter of the series was released in September 2016, leaving the story incomplete; another comic book series, titled Injustice: Ground Zero, followed afterwards, which picked up the story and concluded the retelling of the game's events from Harley Quinn's perspective.

During NetherRealm Studios' Injustice 2 panel at San Diego Comic-Con International on July 22, 2016, Boon announced a digital comic book series which will detail the backstory to the events of the game. The series is written by Tom Taylor, who had previously worked on the tie-in comic books for Injustice: Gods Among Us. Bruno Redondo is its lead artist, with contributing artwork from Juan Albarran, Daniel Sempere, and Mike S. Miller. Beginning on April 11, 2017, the series was released in weekly chapters through various digital retailers, including ComiXology, Google Play Books, the Kindle Store, and DC Comics' own mobile app. Print versions became available for purchase on May 3, 2017, each containing multiple digital chapters.

A miniseries known as Injustice vs. Masters of the Universe featuring a crossover with Mattel's Masters of the Universe franchise was first published on July 18, 2018, by DC Comics. It is written by Tim Seeley with art by Freddie Williams II, and follows the second game's alternate ending, where Superman wins out over Batman. After killing Braniac and combining himself with Braniac ship, Superman has turned Batman with the help of Braniac technology into the Black Oracle, who can predict crimes before they happen, very similar to Minority Report style. Damian Wayne, who has become an adult finally realise with Cyborg that they have been fighting for the wrong side the entire time and then reform seeking the help of the Masters of the Universe in stopping Superman for good. Damian manages to free Batman from Superman's control but is killed by Wonder Woman for his betrayal which triggers Batman's release from Superman's programming. After Darkseid and Skeletor forces invades Earth and Eternia, they all needs to co-operate to save the world.

In February 2023, it was announced that the universe of Injustice would be returning in the Dawn of DC miniseries Adventures of Superman: Jon Kent, written by the original Injustice writer Tom Taylor.

Film

On May 19, 2021, it was announced that an animated Injustice film is in the works as part of the DC Universe Animated Original Movies line. On July 21, 2021, more details for the film were revealed as it will be an adaptation of the Year One comic series, featuring a very whole different voice cast instead of the regular cast from the games. The film was released for digital and physical formats on October 19, 2021.

Reception

The series has been a critical and commercial success, with praise going to its story, gameplay mechanics, presentation, an abundance of in-game content, character customization options, and use of the DC Comics license.

The animated Injustice movie, however, received mixed reviews.  Criticism was leveled at the unceremonious character deaths, poor character development, unfaithfulness to the source material, and overstuffed plot. Some reviewers, however, praised the voice acting and animation.

See also
Marvel vs. Capcom: a fighting game crossover between the heroes of Marvel and the characters from Capcom’s various video games.
Mortal Kombat vs. DC Universe: A 2008 video game developed by Midway Games, with similar gameplay, aesthetic, and many of the same characters, that served as the inspiration for the Injustice games.

References

 
Dystopian video games
Unreal Engine games
Video game franchises
Video game franchises introduced in 2013
Video games adapted into comics
Video games adapted into films
Video games developed in the United States
Video games about parallel universes
Warner Bros. video games
2.5D fighting games